Al kharabah may refer to:
Al kharabah, Jizan, Saudi Arabia
Al kharabah, San‘a’, Yemen
Al kharabah, Hadhramaut, Yemen